Igor Liubchenko is a Ukrainian Muay Thai fighter. He is one of the most successful amateur Muay Thai athletes of all time.

Biography and career
Liubchenko started Muay Thai training at the age of 12, he holds a Master of Sports of Ukraine in Thai boxing.

Igor Liubchenko faced Hiroya at MAX Muay Thai 5: The Final Chapter in Khon Kaen, Thailand on December 10, 2013. He was defeated by second round knockout via high kick.

On April 28, 2017, Liubchenko took part in the EM Legend Kickboxing World Tournament in the 63 kg division. He defeated Meng Kang from China by technical knockout in the semi-final and was defeated by knockout in the final against Anvar Boynazarov.

On September 30, 2017, Liubchenko faced Pakorn P.K. Saenchai Muaythaigym at All-Star Fight 2. He lost the fight by decision.

On May 6, 2018, Liubchenko entered the 8-man Real Hero tournament in Bangkok, Thailand. He defeated three opponents in one night all by knockout to capture the tournament title.

On March 9, 2019, Liubchenko faced Superbank Mor Ratanabandit at All Star Fight: World Soldier. He lost the fight by decision.

On October 16, 2021, Liubchenko travelled to Hungary to face Spéth Norbert. He lost the fight by decision after three rounds.

Titles and accomplishments

Professional
 2015 WMC King's Birthday Tournament Runner-up
 2018 Real Hero Muay Thai 63 kg Tournament Winner

Amateur
International Federation of Muaythai Associations
 2008 IFMA European Championships −57 kg 
 2009 IFMA World Championships −57 kg 
 2010 IFMA European Championships −57 kg 
 2011 IFMA World Championships −60 kg 
 2011 IFMA European Championships −60 kg 
 2012 IFMA European Championships −63.5 kg 
 2012 IFMA World Championships −63.5 kg 
 2014 IFMA World Championships −63.5 kg 
 2014 IFMA European Championships −63.5 kg 
 2015 IFMA World Championships −63.5 kg 
 2016 IFMA World Championships −63.5 kg 
 2017 IFMA World Championships −63.5 kg 
 2018 IFMA World Championships −63.5 kg 
 2019 IFMA World Championships −63.5 kg 
 2022 IFMA European Championships −67 kg 
World Games
 2010 World Games Muay Thai −57 kg 
 2013 World Games Muay Thai −63.5 kg 
 2017 World Games Muay Thai −63.5 kg 
 2022 World Games Muay Thai −63.5 kg 
Arafura Games
 2019 Arafura Games Muay Thai −63.5 kg

Awards
 2015 National Olympic Committee of Ukraine Triumph of the Year

Fight record

|-  style="background:#fbb;"
| 2021-10-16|| Loss ||align=left| Spéth Norbert || Superfight Series || Székesfehérvár, Hungary || Decision || 3 || 3:00

|-  style="background:#fbb;"
| 2019-03-09|| Loss ||align=left| Superbank Mor Ratanabandit || All Star Fight || Bangkok, Thailand || Decision || 5 || 3:00

|-  style="text-align:center; background:#cfc;"
| 2018-12-01 || Win ||align=left| Wang Zhiwei || Wu Lin Feng −67kg World Cup 2018–2019 Group D || Zhengzhou, China || Decision || 3 || 3:00

|-  style="background:#cfc;"
| 2018-05-06 || Win ||align=left| Jarwdjew Singnakonkui|| Real Hero Tournament, Final || Bangkok, Thailand || KO ||  || 
|-
!  style=background:white colspan=9 |

|-  style="background:#cfc;"
| 2018-05-06 || Win ||align=left| Batjargal Sundui|| Real Hero Tournament, Semi-finals || Bangkok, Thailand || KO ||  ||

|-  style="background:#cfc;"
| 2018-05-06 || Win ||align=left| Limpetch CourageFightTeam|| Real Hero Tournament, Quarter Finals || Bangkok, Thailand || KO ||  ||

|-  style="background:#fbb;"
| 2017-09-30|| Loss || align="left" | Pakorn P.K. Saenchai Muaythaigym || All-Star Fight 2 || Bangkok, Thailand || Decision || 3 || 3:00

|- style="background:#fbb"
| 2017-04-28 || Loss ||align=left| Anvar Boynazarov || EM Legend, 18 Tournament Final || Chengdu, China || TKO (Punches) || 2 || 0:40
|-
!  style=background:white colspan=9 |

|- style="background:#cfc"
| 2017-04-28 || Win||align=left| Meng Kang || EM Legend, 18 Tournament Semi-final || Chengdu, China || TKO  ||  ||

|- style="background:#cfc"
| 2017-04-03 || Win ||align=left| || SUPER MUAY THAI || Bangkok, Thailand || TKO|| 2 ||

|- style="background:#cfc"
| 2016-12-03 || Win ||align=left| Lakhin || SUPER MUAY THAI || Bangkok, Thailand || Decision || 3|| 3:00

|-  bgcolor="#cfc"
| 2016-10-28 || Win ||align=left|  || Wu Fight|| China || Decision || 3 || 3:00

|-  style="background:#fbb;"
| 2015-12-12 || Loss ||align=left| Petchtanong Banchamek|| SUPER MUAYTHAI  || Bangkok, Thailand || Decision (Unanimous) || 3 || 3:00 
|-
! style=background:white colspan=9 |

|-  style="background:#fbb;"
| 2015-12-05 || Loss ||align=left| Fahmai Ansukhumvit || King's Birthday – WMC 16-man Tournament, Final || Bangkok, Thailand || Decision || 1 ||3:00

|-  style="background:#cfc;"
| 2015-12-05 || Win||align=left| Pavel Delenic || King's Birthday – WMC 16-man Tournament, Semi-final || Bangkok, Thailand || Decision || 1 ||3:00 

|-  style="background:#cfc;"
| 2015-12-05 || Win||align=left| Samuel Bark || King's Birthday – WMC 16-man Tournament, Quarter Final || Bangkok, Thailand || Decision || 1 ||3:00 

|-  style="background:#cfc;"
| 2015-12-05 || Win ||align=left| Thepabutr Dadpong || King's Birthday – WMC 16-man Tournament, First Round || Bangkok, Thailand || Decision || 1 ||3:00 

|-  bgcolor="#fbb"
| 2015-01-31 || Loss ||align=left| Deng Zeqi || Wu Lin Feng || China || TKO (Left Hook) ||  ||

|-  style="background:#cfc;"
| 2014-09-13 || Win ||align=left| Yokpetch Petchkasem || Topking World Series || Minsk, Belarus || KO || 3 ||

|-  style="text-align:center; background:#fbb;"
| 2013-12-10 || Loss ||align=left| Hiroya|| MAX Muay Thai 5: The Final Chapter || Khon Kaen, Thailand || KO (High kick) || 2 ||

|-  style="text-align:center; background:#cfc;"
| 2013-09-28 || Win ||align=left| Vitalie Matei|| KOK World GP 2013 || Chișinău, Moldova || Decision || 3 || 3:00

|-  style="text-align:center; background:#cfc;"
| 2011-07-02 || Win ||align=left| Sasa Jovanovic || X3 League || Austria || Decision || 3 || 3:00

|-  style="text-align:center; background:#cfc;"
| 2009-12-09 || Win ||align=left| Ponchai Sorruengsawat ||  || Ko Samui, Thailand || KO (Uppercut)|| 1 ||

|-  style="text-align:center; background:#cfc;"
| 2009-05-09 || Win ||align=left| Roman Mailov ||  || Ivano-Frankivsk, Ukraine || Decision || 3 || 3:00

|-
| colspan=9 | Legend:    

|-  style="background:#cfc;"
| 2022-07-17|| Win||align=left| Weerasak Tharakhajad ||IFMA at the 2022 World Games, Final|| Birmingham, Alabama, US || Decision (29:29)|| 3 ||3:00 
|-
! style=background:white colspan=9 |

|-  style="background:#cfc;"
| 2022-07-16|| Win ||align=left| Joseph Mueller ||IFMA at the 2022 World Games, Semi-finals|| Birmingham, Alabama, US || Decision (30:27) || 3 ||3:00

|-  style="background:#cfc;"
| 2022-07-15||Win||align=left| Abil Galiyev ||IFMA at the 2022 World Games, Quarter Finals|| Birmingham, Alabama, US || Decision (30:26) || 3 ||3:00

|-  style="background:#fbb;"
| 2022-02-19 || Loss ||align=left| Dmitry Varats || 2022 IFMA European Championships, Semi-final || Istanbul, Turkey || TKO || 3 ||
|-
! style=background:white colspan=9 |

|-  style="background:#fbb;"
| 2021-12-11 || Loss ||align=left| Weerasak Tharakhajad || 2021 IFMA World Championships, Final || Bangkok, Thailand || Decision (29:28) || 3 ||
|-
! style=background:white colspan=9 |

|-  style="background:#cfc;"
| 2021-12-10 || Win ||align=left| Abil Galiyev || 2021 IFMA World Championships, Semi-finals || Bangkok, Thailand || Decision (30:27) || 3 ||

|-  style="background:#cfc;"
| 2021-12-09 || Win ||align=left| Linus Bylander || 2021 IFMA World Championships, Quarter Finals || Bangkok, Thailand || Decision (30:27)|| 3 ||

|-  style="background:#cfc;"
| 2021-12-08 || Win ||align=left| Jose Luis Saenz || 2021 IFMA World Championships, Round 2 || Bangkok, Thailand || TKO ||2 ||

|-  bgcolor="#cfc"
| 2019-07-28 || Win||align=left| Abdulmalik Mugidinov || 2019 IFMA World Championships, Final|| Bangkok, Thailand || Decision (29–28)|| 3 || 3:00 
|-
! style=background:white colspan=9 |

|-  bgcolor="#cfc"
| 2019-07-26 || Win||align=left| Kittiphop Mueangprom || 2019 IFMA World Championships, Semi-final|| Bangkok, Thailand || Decision (29–28)|| 3 || 3:00

|-  bgcolor="#CCFFCC"
| 2019-07-25 || Win||align=left| Serdar Koc || 2019 IFMA World Championships, Quarter Final|| Bangkok, Thailand || TKO || 2 ||

|-  bgcolor="#CCFFCC"
| 2019-07-24 || Win||align=left| Lukas Mandinec || 2019 IFMA World Championships, Second Round|| Bangkok, Thailand || TKO|| 1 ||

|-  bgcolor="#cfc"
| 2019-05-01 || Win||align=left| Lorenzo Sammartino || 2019 Arafura Games, Final|| Bangkok, Thailand || TKO|| 3 ||  
|-
! style=background:white colspan=9 |

|-  bgcolor="#cfc"
| 2019-04-30 || Win||align=left| Sung-Sen Huang || 2019 Arafura Games, Semi-finals|| Bangkok, Thailand || TKO|| 1 ||

|-  bgcolor="#cfc"
| 2019-04-29 || Win||align=left| Ryan Jakiri || 2019 Arafura Games, Quarter Finals|| Bangkok, Thailand || TKO|| 2 ||

|-  bgcolor="#cfc"
| 2019-03-16 || Win ||align=left| Vladyslav Yarmak || 2019 Ukraine Kickboxing Championship, Final|| Odessa, Ukraine || Decision||3||3:00
|-
! style=background:white colspan=9 |

|-  bgcolor="#CCFFCC"
| 2018-05-19 || Win||align=left| Abdulmalik Mugidinov || 2018 IFMA World Championships, Final|| Cancún, Mexico || Decision (30:27)|| 3 ||3:00 
|-
! style=background:white colspan=9 |

|-  bgcolor="#CCFFCC"
| 2018-05-16 || Win||align=left| Mathias Jonsson || 2018 IFMA World Championships, Semi-final|| Cancún, Mexico || Decision (30:26)|| 3 ||3:00

|-  bgcolor="#CCFFCC"
| 2018-05-14 || Win||align=left| Carlos Henrique Klimacheski || 2018 IFMA World Championships, Quarter Final|| Cancún, Mexico || TKO|| 2 ||

|-  bgcolor="#CCFFCC"
| 2018-05-12 || Win||align=left| Abil Galiyev || 2018 IFMA World Championships, Second Round|| Cancún, Mexico || TKO|| 1 ||

|-  bgcolor="#cfc"
| 2017-07-30 || Win||align=left| Ali Zanrifar || 2017 World Games, Final|| Wroclaw, Poland || Decision (30–27)|| 3 || 3:00 
|-
! style=background:white colspan=9 |

|-  bgcolor="#cfc"
| 2017-07-29|| Win||align=left| Ahmad Ondash || 2017 World Games, Semi-final|| Wroclaw, Poland || TKO||  ||

|-  bgcolor="#cfc"
| 2017-07-28 || Win||align=left| Abil Galiyev || 2017 World Games, Quarter Final|| Wroclaw, Poland || TKO||  ||

|-  bgcolor="#fbb"
| 2017-05-10 || Loss ||align=left| Artem Avanesov || 2017 IFMA World Championships, Semi-finals|| Minsk, Belarus || Decision (29:28) || 3 || 3:00
|-
! style=background:white colspan=9 |

|-  bgcolor="#cfc"
| 2017-05-07 || Win ||align=left| Oskar Siegert || 2017 IFMA World Championships, Quarter Finals|| Minsk, Belarus || TKO || 3 ||

|-  bgcolor="#cfc"
| 2017-05-05 || Win ||align=left| Nasim Kazem || 2017 IFMA World Championships, 1/8 Finals|| Minsk, Belarus || TKO || 2 ||

|-  style="background:#cfc;"
| 2016-11-26|| Win ||align=left| Pavel Valteran || IFMA World Cup 2016 in Kazan, Final || Kazan, Russia || Decision || 3 ||
|-
! style=background:white colspan=9 |

|-  style="background:#cfc;"
| 2016-11-24|| Win ||align=left| Youssouf Binate|| IFMA World Cup 2016 in Kazan, Semi-final || Kazan, Russia || Decision || 3 ||

|-  bgcolor="#cfc"
| 2016-05-28 || Win ||align=left| Vladimir Kuzmin || 2016 IFMA World Championships, Final|| Jonkoping, Sweden || Decision (30:27) || 3 || 3:00
|-
! style=background:white colspan=9 |

|-  bgcolor="#cfc"
| 2016-05-26 || Win ||align=left| Bakaar Gelenidze || 2016 IFMA World Championships, Semi-finals|| Jonkoping, Sweden || TKO || 1 ||

|-  bgcolor="#cfc"
| 2016-05-24 || Win ||align=left| Jonathan Polosan || 2016 IFMA World Championships, Quarter Finals|| Jonkoping, Sweden || Decision (30:27)|| 3 || 3:00

|-  bgcolor="#cfc"
| 2016-02-07 || Win ||align=left| Dmitry Godlevsky || 2016 Ukraine Muay Thai Championship, Final|| Odessa, Ukraine || Decision||3||3:00
|-
! style=background:white colspan=9 |

|-  bgcolor="#cfc"
| 2015-08- || Win ||align=left| Itay Guyer || 2015 IFMA World Championships, Final|| Bangkok, Thailand || Decision || 3 || 3:00
|-
! style=background:white colspan=9 |

|-  bgcolor="#cfc"
| 2015-08- || Win ||align=left| Kaeosikhao Kriangkai || 2015 IFMA World Championships, Semi-final|| Bangkok, Thailand || Decision || 3 || 3:00

|-  bgcolor="#cfc"
| 2015-08- || Win ||align=left| Dzmitry Filipau || 2015 IFMA World Championships, Quarter Final|| Bangkok, Thailand || TKO || ||

|-  bgcolor="#cfc"
| 2015-08- || Win ||align=left| Geerts Dries || 2015 IFMA World Championships, Quarter Final|| Bangkok, Thailand || TKO || 3||

|-  bgcolor="#cfc"
| 2015-07- || Win ||align=left| Andrey Perzhanovsky || 2015 Ukraine Muay Thai Championship, Final|| Ukraine || TKO|| 2 ||
|-
! style=background:white colspan=9 |

|-  bgcolor="#fbb"
| 2014-09- || Loss ||align=left| Dmitry Varats || 2014 IFMA European Championships, Final|| Krakow, Poland || Decision || 3 || 3:00
|-
! style=background:white colspan=9 |

|-  bgcolor="#cfc"
| 2014-09- || Win ||align=left| Itay Gayer || 2014 IFMA European Championships, Semi-finals|| Krakow, Poland || Decision || 3 || 3:00

|-  bgcolor="#cfc"
| 2014-09- || Win ||align=left| Andrey Khromov || 2014 IFMA European Championships, Quarter Finals|| Krakow, Poland || Decision || 3 || 3:00

|-  bgcolor="#cfc"
| 2014-05- || Win ||align=left| Dmitry Varats || 2014 IFMA World Championships, Final|| Langkawi, Malaysia || Decision || 3 || 3:00
|-
! style=background:white colspan=9 |

|-  bgcolor="#cfc"
| 2014-05- || Win ||align=left| Jonathan Polosan|| 2014 IFMA World Championships, Semi-finals|| Langkawi, Malaysia || Decision || 3 || 3:00

|-  bgcolor="#cfc"
| 2014-05- || Win ||align=left| Boburjon Tagayev|| 2014 IFMA World Championships, Quarter Finals|| Langkawi, Malaysia || Decision || 3 || 3:00

|-  bgcolor="#cfc"
| 2014-05- || Win ||align=left| Suranto Virayo|| 2014 IFMA World Championships, First Round|| Langkawi, Malaysia || Decision || 3 || 3:00

|-  style="background:#cfc;"
| 2013-10-23 || Win ||align=left| Manop Srirupi || 2013 World Combat Games, Final || Bangkok, Thailand || Decision || 3 ||3:00 
|-
! style=background:white colspan=9 |

|-  style="background:#cfc;"
| 2013-10-21 || Win ||align=left| Dmitry Varats || 2013 World Combat Games, Semi-final || Bangkok, Thailand || Decision || 3 ||3:00

|-  style="background:#fbb;"
| 2013-07-24 || Loss||align=left| Dmitry Varats || 2013 IFMA European Championship || Lisbon, Portugal || Decision || 3 ||3:00

|-  style="background:#fbb;"
| 2012-09-13||Loss ||align=left| Klumya Akephon || 2012 IFMA World Championships, Final || Saint Petersburg, Russia ||Decision  || 3 || 2:00
|-
! style=background:white colspan=9 |

|-  style="background:#cfc;"
| 2012-09-11|| Win ||align=left| Hakeem Dawodu || 2012 IFMA World Championships 2012, Semi-finals || Saint Petersburg, Russia || Decision (Split)  || 3 || 3:00

|-  bgcolor="#cfc"
| 2012-09-10 || Win||align=left| Firdavsiy Kholmuratov || 2012 IFMA World Championships, Quarter Finals|| Saint Petersburg, Russia ||  ||  ||

|-  bgcolor="#cfc"
| 2012-09-08 || Win ||align=left| Jose Maria Quevedo Tapia|| 2012 IFMA World Championships, First Round|| Saint Petersburg, Russia ||  ||  ||

|-  style="background:#fbb;"
| 2012-04-|| Loss||align=left| Dmitry Varats || 2012 IFMA European Championships 2012, Final || Antalya, Turkey || Decision || 3 || 3:00
|-
! style=background:white colspan=9 |

|-  style="background:#cfc;"
| 2012-04-|| Win ||align=left| Garik Kalashyan || 2012 IFMA European Championships 2012, Semi-finals || Antalya, Turkey || Decision || 3 || 3:00

|-  style="background:#cfc;"
| 2012-04-|| Win ||align=left| Cristian Spetcu || 2012 IFMA European Championships 2012 || Antalya, Turkey || Decision || 3 || 3:00

|-  bgcolor="#cfc"
| 2012-01-29 || Win ||align=left| Nikolay Kyrylov|| 2012 Ukraine Muay Thai Championship, Final|| Odessa, Ukraine || TKO|| 1 ||
|-
! style=background:white colspan=9 |

|-  style="background:#fbb;"
| 2011-09-27||Loss ||align=left| Wuttichai Meechan || 2011 IFMA World Championships, Final || Tashkent, Uzbekistan || Decision || 3 || 3:00
|-
! style=background:white colspan=9 |

|-  style="background:#cfc;"
| 2011-09-25|| Win ||align=left| Abdul Khudoyberdiev || 2011 IFMA World Championships 2011, Semi-finals || Tashkent, Uzbekistan || TKO  || 3 ||

|-  style="background:#cfc;"
| 2011-09-23|| Win ||align=left| Masoud Abdolmalek|| 2011 IFMA World Championships 2011, Quarter Finals || Tashkent, Uzbekistan || Decision || 3 || 3:00

|-  style="background:#fbb;"
| 2011-04-||Loss ||align=left| Dmitry Varats || 2011 IFMA European Championships, Final || Antalya, Turkey || Decision || 4 || 2:00
|-
! style=background:white colspan=9 |

|-  style="background:#cfc;"
| 2011-04-|| Win ||align=left| Penafel Volotan || 2011 IFMA European Championships, Semi-finals || Antalya, Turkey || Decision || 4 || 2:00

|-  bgcolor="#cfc"
| 2011-02-07 || Win ||align=left| Mikhail Vasilioglo || 2011 Ukraine Muay Thai Championship, Final|| Ukraine || Decision||  ||
|-
! style=background:white colspan=9 |

|-  style="background:#FFBBBB;"
| 2010-12- || Loss ||align=left| Dmitry Varats || 2010 I.F.M.A. World Muaythai Championships, Quarter Finals || Bangkok, Thailand || Decision ||4||2:00

|-  style="background:#cfc;"
| 2010-12- || Win||align=left| Hudoybarbiev || 2010 I.F.M.A. World Muaythai Championships || Bangkok, Thailand || Decision ||4||2:00

|-  style="background:#cfc;"
| 2010-09- || Win ||align=left| Witsanu Chankhunthod || 2010 World Combat Games, Final || Beijing, China || Decision ||  || 
|-
! style=background:white colspan=9 |

|-  style="background:#cfc;"
| 2010-09- || Win ||align=left| Wang Kang || 2010 World Combat Games, Semi-finals || Beijing, China || Decision ||  ||

|-  style="background:#cfc;"
| 2010-09- || Win ||align=left| Wong Siu Hang|| 2010 World Combat Games, Quarter Finals || Beijing, China || KO || 2 ||

|-  style="background:#cfc;"
| 2010-05- || Win ||align=left| Murat Antepli || 2010 IFMA European Championship, Final|| Rome, Italy || TKO || 3 || 
|-
! style=background:white colspan=9 |

|-  style="background:#cfc;"
| 2010-05- || Win ||align=left| Konstantin Nechaev || 2010 IFMA European Championship|| Rome, Italy || Decision || 4 ||2:00

|-  style="background:#fbb;"
| 2010-12- || Loss||align=left| Witsanu Chankhutkhon|| 2009 IFMA World Championships, Quarter Finals || Bangkok, Thailand || Decision ||4||2:00

|-  style="background:#cfc;"
| 2010-11- || Win||align=left| Tural Shafiev || 2009 IFMA World Championships, 1/8 Finals|| Bangkok, Thailand || TKO ||2||
|-
| colspan=9 | Legend:

References

1991 births
Igor Liubchenko
Ukrainian male kickboxers
Living people